Compsolechia desectella is a moth of the family Gelechiidae. It was described by Zeller in 1877. It is found in Cuba.

References

Moths described in 1877
Compsolechia